Laos is a country in southeast Asia.

Laos or LAOS may also refer to:
Lao River, a river of southern Italy
Laüs, an ancient Greek colony situated on the above river
Vjosa, a river of Epirus
Galangal, aka Laos, an oriental spice
Popular Orthodox Rally, known as LAOS, Greek right-wing populist/nationalist political party
Alpinia galanga, a plant in the ginger family